Herbert E. Paterra (born November 8, 1940) is an American former gridiron football player and coach. He spent a total of 46 years in football and coached at all levels of the game, retiring in 2007. He served as defensive coordinator for the Los Angeles Rams, Buffalo Bills, and Detroit Lions of the National Football League.

References

External links
 

1940 births
Living people
American football linebackers
Buffalo Bills coaches
Buffalo Bills players
Charlotte Hornets (WFL) coaches
Detroit Lions coaches
Edmonton Elks coaches
Green Bay Packers coaches
Hamilton Tiger-Cats coaches
Hamilton Tiger-Cats players
Los Angeles Rams coaches
Michigan State Spartans football coaches
Michigan State Spartans football players
National Football League defensive coordinators
New Mexico State Aggies football coaches
Southeastern Louisiana Lions football coaches
Tampa Bay Buccaneers coaches
Vanderbilt Commodores football coaches
Wyoming Cowboys football coaches
High school football coaches in North Carolina
People from Glassport, Pennsylvania
Players of American football from Pennsylvania